Bruen is a surname.  People with this surname include:

 Jack Bruen (1949-1997), American basketball coach
 Francis Bruen (died 1867), Member of the UK Parliament for Carlow Borough 1835–1837, 1839
 Henry Bruen:
 Henry Bruen (1741–1795), Irish politician, Member of the Parliament of Ireland for Jamestown 1783–1790 and Carlow County 1790–1795
 Colonel Henry Bruen (1789–1852), Irish politician, Member of the UK Parliament for County Carlow 1812–1831, 1835–1837, 1840–1852
 his son Henry Bruen (1828–1912), MP for County Carlow 1857–1880
 Ken Bruen (born 1951), Irish writer
 John Bruen (1560–1625), English Puritan squire

See also 
Bruen Stapleford, a civil parish in the unitary authority of Cheshire West, in England
USS Sarah Bruen (1862), a wooden schooner acquired by the United States Navy during the beginning of the American Civil War
New York State Rifle & Pistol Association, Inc. v. Bruen (NYSRPA v. Bruen), a Second Amendment landmark decision issued by the U.S. Supreme Court in 2022